Roche is a large crater on the far side of the Moon from the Earth. The prominent crater Pauli lies across the southern rim of Roche, and the outer rampart of Pauli covers a portion of Roche's interior floor. To the north-northwest of Roche is the crater Eötvös, and just to the west-northwest lies Rosseland.

The western rim of Roche has been somewhat distorted and straightened. The rim as a whole is worn and eroded, with multiple tiny craterlets marking the surface. The satellite crater Roche B lies across the northeastern inner wall.

The interior floor of Roche is relatively level, but is also marked by several small and tiny craterlets. A grouping of these craters lies near the midpoint. Just to the northwest of this grouping is a bright patch of high-albedo material. Sections of the floor along the north-northwestern side have a lower albedo than elsewhere, usually an indication of basaltic-lava flows similar to what fills the lunar maria. The extent of this patch may actually be larger, but covered with higher-albedo ejecta.

Satellite craters
By convention, these features are identified on lunar maps by placing the letter on the side of the crater midpoint that is closest to Roche.

References

 
 
 
 
 
 
 
 
 
 
 
 

Impact craters on the Moon